Kevin Gatter (5 November 1951 – 22 June 2017) was an English pathologist who created a technique for identifying the source of cancer in the human body.

Gatter was the Head of the Department of Cellular Science at St John's College, Oxford and an internationally recognized expert in haematopathology.

References 

1951 births
2017 deaths
People from Luton
English pathologists
Academics of the University of Oxford
Alumni of St John's College, Oxford
Physicians of the John Radcliffe Hospital
Deaths from prostate cancer
Fellows of St John's College, Oxford